Tommories "Mossy" Cade (born December 26, 1961 in Eloy, Arizona) is a former professional American football player who played safety first for the Memphis Showboats of the USFL in 1985 and then for two seasons (1985–86) for the Green Bay Packers. He attended the University of Texas, where he made the 1983 All-American team.

Cade was convicted in 1987 of two counts of second degree sexual assault on a woman he was related to through marriage.
He was acquitted of a third count, and served 15 months in jail.

Upon release, he was signed by the Minnesota Vikings but was quickly released after public outcry over his signing.

See also
 List of Texas Longhorns football All-Americans
 List of Los Angeles Chargers first-round draft picks

References

1961 births
Living people
People from Eloy, Arizona
Sportspeople from the Phoenix metropolitan area
African-American players of American football
American football safeties
Texas Longhorns football players
Green Bay Packers players
Memphis Showboats players
21st-century African-American people
20th-century African-American sportspeople